Genesis is the debut album by British band the Gods. The LP was recorded in 1968 and released that same year by EMI / Columbia Records) in the UK. It was re-issued on CD by Repertoire Records in 1994.

Track listing
  "Towards the Skies" (Konas) – 3:25
  "Candles Getting Shorter" (Konas, Hensley) – 4:28
  "You're My Life" (Konas, Kerslake) – 3:20
  "Looking Glass" (Konas, Hensley) – 4:14
  "Misleading Colours" (Kerslake, Konas) – 3:40
  "Radio Show" (Robertson, Sugarman) – 3:11
  "Plastic Horizon" (Robertson, Sugarman) – 3:26
  "Farthing Man" (Konas) – 3:30
  "I Never Know" (Konas, Hensley) – 5:41
  "Time and Eternity" (Konas, Kerslake) – 2:43

Bonus tracks on 1994 CD reissue
  "Baby's Rich" (Konas, Hensley) – 2:48
  "Somewhere in the Street" (Hensley) – 2:50
  "Hey Bulldog" (Lennon–McCartney) – 3:03
  "Real Love Guaranteed" (Konas, Hensley) – 2:29

When it came out in 1968, the LP consisted of 10 tracks. The 1994 CD version has an additional four songs. It features both sides of the band's extremely rare 45rpm singles "Baby's Rich" and "Hey Bulldog". The cover of the CD shows the original sleeve artwork which was designed by Hipgnosis.

Personnel 
John Glascock – bass, vocals
Ken Hensley – guitar, percussion, keyboards, vocals
Lee Kerslake – drums
Joe Konas – guitar, vocals

Additional personnel
Peter Vince – Engineer
Mark Brennan – Liner Notes

References 

1968 debut albums
EMI Columbia Records albums
Repertoire Records albums
Albums with cover art by Hipgnosis
The Gods (band) albums